is a Japanese Nippon Professional Baseball manager and former player. He is currently the manager for the Japan national baseball team.

External links

1961 births
Living people
Baseball people from Tokyo Metropolis
People from Kodaira, Tokyo
Tokyo Gakugei University alumni
Japanese baseball players
Nippon Professional Baseball outfielders
Yakult Swallows players
Managers of baseball teams in Japan
Hokkaido Nippon-Ham Fighters managers